The 4th NACAC Under-23 Championships in Athletics were held in Santo Domingo, Dominican Republic on July 7–9, 2006.    A detailed
report on the results was given.

Medal summary

Medal winners are published.
Complete results can be found on the Athletics Canada, the AtletismoCR, the CACAC and the USA Track & Field website.

Men

Women

Medal table (unofficial)

Participation
The participation of 373 athletes from all 32 NACAC member federations was reported.

 (2)
 (3)
 (1)
 (10)
 (8)
 (3)
 (2)
 (2)
 (41)
 (5)
 (5)
 (25)
 (1)
 (58)
 (5)
 (2)
 (7)
 Haïti (2)
 (2)
 (14)
 México (31)
 (1)
 (3)
 (2)
 (27)
 (4)
 (2)
 (5)
 (15)
 (3)
 (80)
 (2)

References

NACAC Under-23 Championships in Athletics
2006 in Dominican Republic sport
NACAC U23
2006 in Caribbean sport
International athletics competitions hosted by the Dominican Republic
2006 in youth sport